South Carolina Highway 198 (SC 198) is a  primary state highway in the U.S. state of South Carolina. It connects the town of Blacksburg at Interstate 85 (I-85) exit 102 and the northern terminus of SC 5 with the town of Earl, North Carolina by way of North Carolina Highway 198 (NC 198). Though it physically travels north and south, internal SCDOT data and the only signage of SC 198 at the I-85/SC 5 interchange indicates that it travels east–west.

Route description

A two-lane rural highway, it traverses , starting in Blacksburg, it goes north to the North Carolina state line at Buffalo Creek.  The highway continues towards Earl and eventually to Patterson Springs.

History
Around 2006-2009, its southern terminus was shortened to I-85 and to a new western terminus of SC 5, which its southern section was designated too.

Major intersections

See also

References

External links 

SC 198 at Virginia Highways' South Carolina Highways Annex

198
Transportation in Cherokee County, South Carolina